Ramaswamy Prasanna (born 7 April 1982) is an Indian first-class cricketer who plays for Tamil Nadu.

References

External links
 

1982 births
Living people
Indian cricketers
Tamil Nadu cricketers
Cricketers from Chennai